Wilhelm Josef Dick (10 September 1897  –1980) was a Czechoslovak ski jumper who competed in the 1920s. He won two ski jumping medals at the FIS Nordic World Ski Championships with a gold in 1925 and a silver in 1927.

At the 1926 FIS Nordic World Ski Championships he competed for Germany under the name Willy Dick.

He was a Sudeten German. After the expulsion of Germans from Czechoslovakia after World War II he lived in Garmisch-Partenkirchen and in 1952 he moved to Wermelskirchen in North Rhine-Westphalia, where he died in 1980.

References

1897 births
1980 deaths
German male ski jumpers
Czechoslovak male ski jumpers
Sudeten German people
FIS Nordic World Ski Championships medalists in ski jumping
People from Vejprty
Sportspeople from the Ústí nad Labem Region